Hidden Singer is an international music game show franchise. It is originated of the South Korean program of the same name, developed by JTBC.

International versions
 – Currently airing
 – Ceased to air
 – Undetermined

References

Television franchises
Musical game shows